Pennington's Choice is a 1915 American silent drama film directed by William Bowman and starring Francis X. Bushman and Beverly Bayne a popular film acting team of the era. It was distributed by Metro Pictures.

In audio recordings made in the early 1960s, Bushman talks about the making of and success of this film.

A copy donated by the MGM survives at George Eastman House Motion Picture Collection Rochester New York.

Cast
Francis X. Bushman as Robert Pennington
Wellington Playter as Jules Blondeau
H. O'Dell as Louis Blondeau
William Farris as Roland Blondeau
Beverly Bayne as Eugenia Blondeau / Marie Blondeau
Helen Dunbar as Mrs. Allison
Lester Cuneo as Jean
Morris Cytron as Pierre
Jim Jeffries as himself (credited as J.J. Jeffries)
Gibson Gowland as Mountain Man (uncredited)
Arthur Housman as Mountain Man (uncredited)

References

External links

1915 films
American silent feature films
American black-and-white films
Silent American drama films
1915 drama films
Metro Pictures films
Films directed by William Bowman
1910s American films
1910s English-language films